Hufeng Highway, designated S3, is a planned expressway within the city of Shanghai. It was originally known as Expressway Line 5 or the A3 expressway. According to preliminary reports, the expressway is expected to cost . In December 2016 the first section was open to public, which is 3.12 km long.

See also
Expressways of Shanghai

References 

Expressways in Shanghai